Jin or Chin (진) is the romanization of a number of Korean surnames, written as 陳, 秦, 眞, or 晉 in hanja.

While some earliest figures of the surname date back to the Korean Kingdom of Baekjae and Silla, other figures include the early Chinese who immigrated to Korea during the era of Goryeo dynasty.       

Similar to the Korean surname Jin, the Chinese surnames Chen and Qin also use the Chinese characters 陳 and 秦.

Notable people 
Jin Godo (眞高道), general of Geunchogo of Baekje
Jin Mu (眞武), prime minister of Baekje
Jin Gong (眞功) was prime minister of Silla
Jin Ho (眞虎), prime minister of Hubaekje
Jin Ham Jo (晉含祚) was officer of Goryeo
Jin Sun-Kuk (born 1970), South Korean track and field sprinter
 Jin Ki-joo, South Korean actress
 Unsuk Chin, South Korean composer

References

Korean-language surnames